El Vergel may refer to:

 El Vergel Airport, in Los Ríos, Chile
 El Vergel (Xochimilco Light Rail), a light rail station in Tlalpan, Mexico City